Barratt House is a historic home located near Greenwood, Greenwood County, South Carolina. It was built about 1853–1856, and is a two-story, Gothic Revival style stuccoed brick house with a standing seam metal roof. Wings were constructed in 1957 and 1969.  It features elaborate woodcarvings and painted murals, which were executed by Dr. John Perkins Barratt, an amateur sculptor and artist. Also on the property are a hewn log structure believed to have been constructed as a schoolhouse for Barratt's children in 1830, a gear house, corn crib, granary, and smokehouse.

It was listed on the National Register of Historic Places in 1985.

References

Houses on the National Register of Historic Places in South Carolina
Gothic Revival architecture in South Carolina
Houses completed in 1856
National Register of Historic Places in Greenwood County, South Carolina
Houses in Greenwood County, South Carolina
Buildings and structures in Greenwood, South Carolina